Mundraga Bay is the 28.6 km wide bay indenting for 23 km Nordenskjöld Coast in Graham Land, Antarctica.  It is entered east of Fothergill Point and west of Cape Sobral.  Local coastline is modified as a result of the Larsen A Ice Shelf disintegration and the subsequent retreat of the inflowing Darvari Glacier, Boryana Glacier, Desudava Glacier, Dinsmoor Glacier, Bombardier Glacier and Edgeworth Glacier in the 1990s and the early 21st century.

The bay is named after the medieval fortress of Mundraga in Northeastern Bulgaria.

Location

Maps
 Antarctic Digital Database (ADD). Scale 1:250000 topographic map of Antarctica. Scientific Committee on Antarctic Research (SCAR). Since 1993, regularly upgraded and updated.

References
 Mundraga Bay. SCAR Composite Antarctic Gazetteer.
 Bulgarian Antarctic Gazetteer. Antarctic Place-names Commission. (details in Bulgarian, basic data in English)

External links
 Mundraga Bay. Copernix satellite image

Bays of Graham Land
Bulgaria and the Antarctic
Nordenskjöld Coast